Kelly David Brownell (born October 31, 1951) is a clinical psychologist and scholar of public health and public policy at Duke University whose work focuses on obesity and food policy. He is a former dean of Duke's Sanford School of Public Policy. Noted for his research dealing primarily with obesity prevention, as well as the intersection of behavior, environment, and health with public policy, Brownell advised former First Lady Michelle Obama's initiatives to address childhood obesity and has testified before Congress. He is credited with coining the term "yo-yo dieting", and was named as one of "The World's 100 Most Influential People" by Time Magazine in 2006.

Personal background
Brownell was born in 1951 and was raised in Indiana. After receiving his Bachelor of Science degree in psychology from Purdue University in 1973, he was awarded a Ph.D in Psychology from Rutgers University in 1977. His advisor was Oscar Krisen Buros Professor G. Terence Wilson.

Career
In 1977, Brownell became a member of the faculty at the University of Pennsylvania's medical school. He began as an assistant professor of psychology in psychiatry, was subsequently promoted to associate professor, and finally to full professor. During this period, he also served one year as a visiting scientist at the National Institutes of Health (NHI) National Cancer Institute (NCI).

In 1991, he joined Yale University, where he held positions as the James Rowland Angell professor of psychology, professor of epidemiology and public health, director of the Rudd Center for Food Policy and Obesity, chair of the department of psychology, and head of the undergraduate dormitory Silliman College.

Brownell left Yale in 2013 to join Duke University as Dean of its Sanford School of Public Policy, in which role he continued until the end of the 2018 academic year. He holds academic appointments as the Robert L. Flowers Professor of Public Policy, Professor of Psychology and Neuroscience, Director of the World Food Policy Center, and is a faculty affiliate of the Duke Global Health Institute.

In 2017, backed by funding from the Duke Endowment, William R. Kenan Jr. Charitable Trust, and Blue Cross and Blue Shield of North Carolina Foundation, Duke University announced the formation of its new World Food Policy Center (WFPC), based at the Sanford School of Public Policy. Brownell is the center's founder and director.

To date, he has authored 15 books and more than 350 scientific articles, papers, and chapters. He has also contributed to mainstream media outlets.

Brownell was previously president of the Society of Behavioral Medicine; Association for the Advancement of Behavior Therapy; and American Psychological Association, Division 38: Society for Health Psychology.

Impact
Brownell's 1986 paper, Understanding and Preventing Relapse, published in American Psychologist, was recognized at the time as one of the most frequently cited papers in psychology.

Recognized for introducing the idea of food taxes as a means of improving public health in 1994, his work on soda taxes has been used by cities, states, and countries seeking to implement them as a public policy tool and tax revenue strategy. In commentary for Time Magazine's "Time 100 of 2006", former Arkansas governor and presidential candidate Mike Huckabee commented that Brownell had "helped set the U.S. agenda by calling for a ban on sweetened-cereal ads aimed at kids and a tax on high-fat, low-nutrition food."

Brownell has also influenced popular culture. In addition to having coined the term "yo-yo dieting", he is also credited with introducing the phrase "toxic food environment" in his 2004 book, Food Fight: The Inside Story of the Food Industry. A frequent radio and television guest, he is the host of the Policy 360 podcast, and has appeared in a variety of feature films and documentaries:
 Super Size Me, feature film, 2004
 Big Mac: Inside the McDonald's Empire, television documentary, 2007
 Killer at Large, documentary, 2008
 The Weight of the Nation, HBO documentary, 2012
 Fed Up, feature film, 2014
 Sustainable, feature film, 2016

Awards and honors 
 Distinguished Alumni Award, Purdue University, 2001
 Elected member, Institute of Medicine, 2005
 Elected member, Connecticut Academy of Science and Engineering, 2006
 Research to Practice Dissemination Award, Society of Behavioral Medicine, 2007
 Graduate School Award for a Lifetime of Distinguished Accomplishments and Service, Rutgers University, 2008
 Person of the Year, New Haven Register, 2009
 Graduate Mentor Award, Social Sciences, Yale University, 2010
 Atkinson-Stern Award for Distinguished Public Service, The Obesity Society, 2010
 Distinguished Scientific Award for the Applications of Psychology, American Psychological Association, 2012
 Lifetime Achievement Award, American Psychological Association, 2012
 The World's Most Influential Scientific Minds, Highly Cited Researchers, Thomson Reuters, 2014, 2015
 David P. Rall Award for Public Health Advocacy, American Public Health Association, 2014
 Joseph Priestley Award, Dickinson College, 2017

The Sanford School of Public Policy's Brownell-Whetten Diversity and Inclusion Award was established in 2016 to recognize the work of Brownell and fellow professor, Kate Whetten.

Selected works
 Behavioral Medicine and Women: A Comprehensive Handbook, 
 Eating, Body Weight, and Performance in Athletes: Disorders of Modern Society 
 Eating Disorders and Obesity, Third Edition: A Comprehensive Handbook, 
 Food and Addition: A Comprehensive Handbook, 
 Handbook of Eating Disorders: Psychology, Physiology, And Treatment, 
 Weight Bias: Nature, Consequences, and Remedies,

See also
 Criticism of fast food
 Fat tax
 Liquid Candy
 Relapse prevention

External links
World Food Policy Center
Policy 360 podcast, Sanford School of Public Policy

Sustainable feature film

References

1951 births
Living people
21st-century American psychologists
Yale University faculty
People from Indiana
Members of the National Academy of Medicine
Duke University faculty
People from Durham, North Carolina
Rutgers University alumni
Brown University alumni
Purdue University alumni
Obesity
Public health
Health policy
20th-century American psychologists